Si Spencer (1961 – 16 February 2021) was a British comic book writer and TV dramatist and editor, with work appearing in British comics such as Crisis, before moving to the American comics industry. He often collaborated with Dean Ormston.

Biography
After starting in Crisis, he was signed up for the hip but short-lived title Revolver where two long series, 'Stickleback' and 'YoYo' were intended to run. The magazine folded before they saw print though and from 1993 to 1995 he was a regular writer for the Judge Dredd Megazine, creating characters such as Harke & Burr and The Creep as well as working on established characters (e.g. Judge Dredd). Si was also editor of comics and music magazine Deadline between 1991 and 1992.

Among North American publishers his work has primarily appeared in series published by DC Comics under their Vertigo imprint, such as Books of Magick: Life During Wartime.

Si Spencer has also written for television. After winning a 'New Voices' competition with the play 'Tracey and Lewis', he secured a position at the BBC as script editor on primetime cop show City Central. He later worked as a staff writer for the BBC's EastEnders and ITV's The Bill in addition to being storyliner and series editor and contributing scripts to Grange Hill. He was credited as script editor on the 2009 Aardman pilot for CBBC show Men in Coats.

In March 2006, it was announced in issue 368 of Doctor Who Magazine that he was to write an episode for the Doctor Who spin-off series Torchwood and even made an appearance at the 2006 Bristol Comic Expo to publicise it though he was not among the writers of episodes for the first series. However, a 2010 book Torch, Wood & Peasants, credited to "Webley Wildfoot" details the story of a writer on a fictitious British SF series and contains a script that has several strong similarities to Torchwood.

His later work included The Vinyl Underground for Vertigo.

In October 2010, Vertigo published the first issue of a Hellblazer mini series, Hellblazer: City of Demons.

Spencer also ran a Facebook page 'Script Doctor' providing advice and support for new writers.

In June 2014, Vertigo published the first issue of his creator-owned monthly eight issue limited series Bodies.

In September 2015, Self Made Hero published the one shot graphic novel Klaxon.

In November 2015, Vertigo comics published the first issue of six-part series Slash and Burn.

In February 2021, Spencer died from reasons unknown.

In 2022 Netflix announced that a series based on Spencer's Vertigo series Bodies had been greenlit, with Moonage Pictures producing.

Bibliography
 "Two pretty names" (with Sue Swassy) in Crisis No. 33, 1989)
 "Strange hotel" (with Adrian Dungworthy, in Crisis No. 62, 1991)
 Judge Death: "Masque of the Judge, Death" (with John McCrea, in Judge Dredd Mega-Special No. 4, 1991)
 Mytek the Mighty: "Mytek Lives!" (with Shaky Kane, in 2000 AD Action Special, 1992)
 Harke & Burr: 
 "Antique and Curious" (with Dean Ormston, in Judge Dredd Megazine (vol. 2) #27–28, 1993)
 "Hamster Horror" (with Dean Ormston, in Judge Dredd Megazine (vol. 2) #40–42, 1995)
 "Grief Encounter" (with Dean Ormston, in 'Judge Dredd Megazine (vol. 2) #47–49, 1994)
 "Secret Origin" (with Paul Peart, in 'Judge Dredd Megazine (vol. 2) No. 83, 1995)
 "Satanic Farces" (with co-author Gordon Rennie and art by Dean Ormston, in Judge Dredd Megazine (vol. 3) #4–7, 1995)
 Judge Dredd: 
 "Creep" (with Kevin Cullen, in Judge Dredd Megazine (vol. 2) #41–44, 1993)
 "Creep's Day Out" (with Kevin Cullen, in Judge Dredd Megazine (vol. 2) No. 50, 1994)
 "Creep: True Love" (with Kevin Cullen, in Judge Dredd Megazine (vol. 2) #51–54, 1994
 "Fall of the House of Esher" (with Dean Ormston, in Judge Dredd Megazine (vol. 2) #70, 1995)
 "A Very Creepy Christmas" (with Kevin Cullen, in Judge Dredd Megazine (vol. 2) #70, 1995)
 "Plagues of Necropolis" (in Judge Dredd Megazine (vol. 2) #78–84, 1995)
 "Sleeping Satellite" (with Morak, in Judge Dredd Mega Special 1995)
 "Judge Planet II" (with Shaky Kane, in Judge Dredd Mega Special 1995)
 The Corps: "Fireteam One" (with Colin MacNeil and Paul Marshall, in 2000 AD No. 923, 1994)
 Books of Magick: Life During Wartime #1–15 (with Dean Ormston, Steve Yeowell and Duncan Fegredo, ongoing series, Vertigo, 2004–2005, trade paperback collects #1–5, 2005)
 The Vinyl Underground #1–12 (with Simon Gane and Cameron Stewart, ongoing series, Vertigo, December 2007 – November 2008) collected as:
 Watching the Detectives (collects #1–5, 128 pages, June 2008)
 Pretty Dead Things (collects #6–12, 128 pages, December 2008)
 Hellblazer: City of Demons (with Sean Murphy, five-issue limited series, Vertigo, December 2010 – February 2011, tpb, May 2011)
 Bodies with Dean Ormston, Tula Lotay, Phil Winslade, Meghan Hetrick, Lee Loughridge, eight part limited series, July 2014 – February 2015
 KLAXON with Dix Grim, 120-page self-contained graphic novel published by Self Made Hero September 2015
 Slash and Burn with Max Dunbar, Ande Park, Nik Filardi, six-part limited series, Vertigo November 2015 – April 2016
 Script Doctor's 100 Writing Tips For TV and Film (Lulu.com, February 2010)
 Script Doctor's 100 More Writing Tips For TV and Film (Lulu.com, September 2010)

Notes

References

 
 
 Si Spencer at Barney

External links
 
 Script Doctor at Facebook
 
 Si Spencer's interview, Student Life, BBC

1961 births
2021 deaths
People educated at Abbeydale Grange School
British comics writers
British television writers
Date of birth missing
Place of birth missing
Place of death missing